Bright Moon may refer to:
Terang Bulan, a Malay-language song
Bright Moon Song and Dance Troupe, Shanghai music and dance group active in the 1920s and 1930s